Permanent Wave is an album by American musician John Hartford, Doug Dillard, and Rodney Dillard, released in 1980 (see 1980 in music).

Permanent Wave was reissued on CD in 1992 along with Glitter Grass from the Nashwood Hollyville Strings on the Flying Fish label.

Track listing
"Break It to Me Gently" (Rodney Dillard) – 3:15
"That'll Be the Day" (Jerry Allison, Buddy Holly, Norman Petty) – 2:21
"Blue Morning" (R. Dillard) – 2:50
"The Same Thing" (Sylvester "Sly Stone" Stewart) – 3:38
"Yakety Yak" (Jerry Leiber, Mike Stoller) – 2:38
"Something's Wrong" (Gene Clark, Doug Dillard) – 2:47
"Boogie on Reggae Woman" (Stevie Wonder) – 5:36
"Country Boy Rock & Roll" (Don Reno) – 2:01
"No Beer in Heaven" (Traditional) – 3:17

Personnel
John Hartford – banjo, guitar, fiddle
Doug Dillard – banjo
Rodney Dillard – guitar, vocals
Philip Aaberg – keyboards
Ginger Blake – vocals
Laura Creamer – vocals
Linda Dillard – vocals
Mac Cridlin – bass
Amos Garrett – guitar
Scott Mathews – drums
Michael Melford – mandolin
Greg Selker – marimba

References

External links
LP Discography of John Hartford.

John Hartford albums
1980 albums
Flying Fish Records albums